Piers Egerton-Warburton  (22 May 1839 – 24 March 1914) was an English Conservative politician who sat in the House of Commons from 1876 to 1885.

Egerton-Warburton was the eldest son of Rowland Eyles Egerton and his wife, Mary Brooke, daughter of Sir Richard Brooke, 6th Baronet. His father assumed the additional surname Warburton  on inheriting estates of his grand uncle Sir Peter Warburton. Egerton-Warburton was educated at Eton College followed by Christ Church, Oxford (BA, 1861). He was a captain in the Earl of Chester's Yeomanry Cavalry and a Magistrate for Cheshire.

In 1876 Egerton-Warburton was elected Member of Parliament for Mid Cheshire. He held the seat until 1885.

Personal life

Egerton-Warburton married Hon. Antoinette Elizabeth Saumarez, daughter of John St Vincent Saumarez, 3rd Baron de Saumarez in 1880. They had two sons and four daughters:

Dorothy Egerton-Warburton (27 July 1882 – 5 November 1954), died unmarried
Eveline Egerton-Warburton ( – 23 November 1967), married in 1940, Bishop Mark Carpenter-Garnier
Capt John Egerton-Warburton (13 December 1883 – 30 August 1915), married Hon. Lettice Legh, daughter of 2nd Baron Newton and died of wounds in First World War
Geoffrey Egerton-Warburton   (18 February 1888 – 1 August 1961), married Hon. Georgiana Mary Dormer , daughter of the 14th Baron Dormer; father of Peter Egerton-Warburton
Margery Antoinette Egerton-Warburton (17 November 1890 – 15 July 1963), died unmarried
Lettice Egerton-Warburton (22 July 1894 – 27 July 1983), died unmarried

Egerton-Warburton lived at Arley Hall near Northwich, where he died at the age of 74.

References

External links
 

1839 births
1914 deaths
People educated at Eton College
Alumni of Christ Church, Oxford
Conservative Party (UK) MPs for English constituencies
UK MPs 1880–1885
UK MPs 1874–1880